Magnor Church is a chapel of the Church of Norway in Eidskog Municipality in Innlandet county, Norway. It is located in the village of Magnor. It is an annex chapel for the Eidskog parish which is part of the Solør, Vinger og Odal prosti (deanery) in the Diocese of Hamar. The white, wooden church was built in a long church design in 1923 using plans drawn up by the architect S. Brenne. The church seats about 100 people.

History

In 1923, a prayer house chapel was built in the village of Magnor. It was consecrated for church use in 1924. The church is a typical wooden long church. The building is today titled as a church, but is technically an annex chapel that belongs to the Eidskog parish with Eidskog Church in Matrand as the main church rather than being its own parish.

See also
List of churches in Hamar

References

Eidskog
Churches in Innlandet
Long churches in Norway
Wooden churches in Norway
20th-century Church of Norway church buildings
Churches completed in 1923
1923 establishments in Norway